Santiago Matías García (born 22 October 1991, in Bell Ville), is an Argentine footballer who currently plays as a midfielder.

References

1991 births
Living people
Argentine footballers
Argentine expatriate footballers
Argentine Primera División players
Primera Nacional players
Liga MX players
Club de Gimnasia y Esgrima La Plata footballers
San Martín de Tucumán footballers
FC Juárez footballers
Expatriate footballers in Mexico
Association football midfielders
Sportspeople from Córdoba Province, Argentina